Grong Sparebank is a Norwegian savings bank based in Grong. The bank is affiliated with the Eika-Gruppen alliance and has branch offices in Grong, Namsos, Steinkjer and Mosjøen. Total assets are NOK 9,5 billion.

History 
The sparebank was founded on April 7, 1862, to serve Grong Parish, that included both Grong, Harran, Høylandet and Røyrvik. By 1905, both Høylandet and Harran wanted to have separate banks, and the bank was split into three branches. In 1955, the bank created a separate branch in Røyrvik and Bergsmo, the later being closed in 1997. The year 1975 saw the merger between Grong Sparebank and Lierne Sparebank, though until 2000 there was a separate board of directors for the Lierne branch. In the 2000s, the bank expanded with a branch in Steinkjer and in 2006 it merged with the smallest bank in Norway, Verran Sparebank in Framverran in Mosvik.

References

External links 

Banks of Norway
Companies based in Trøndelag
Banks established in 1862
Eika Gruppen
Mosvik
Norwegian companies established in 1862